Stalag XI-C Bergen-Belsen, initially called Stalag 311, was a German Army prisoner-of-war camp located near the town of Bergen in Lower Saxony.

Timeline
 May 1940: The camp was built to house Belgian and French enlisted men captured in the Battle of France; initial count: 600.
 July 1941: About 20,000 Soviet prisoners captured during Operation Barbarossa arrived. They were housed in the open while huts were being built. By the spring of 1942 an estimated 18,000 had died of hunger and disease, mainly typhus fever.
 April 1943: Part of the camp is turned into a hospital for POWs. The remainder of the camp is separated and taken over by the SS to house Jews ostensibly for shipment overseas in exchange for German civilians.
 Late 1943: The POW camp is closed and the entire facility becomes Bergen-Belsen concentration camp

See also
 Nazi concentration camps

Sources
  Official web-site of the Bergen-Belsen memorial    
 Official list of Stalags in German.

References
 Bergen-Belsen: Wehrmacht POW Camp 1940–1945, Concentration Camp 1943–1945, Displaced Persons Camp 1945–1950. ed. by Lower Saxony Memorials Foundation, Göttingen 2010. .

World War II prisoner of war camps in Germany